Bharatiya Kranti Dal was a political party in India, formed by the Uttar Pradesh Chief Minister Charan Singh. The party was founded at a meeting in Lucknow in October 1967. After the 1977 general election, the successor party of the BKD, Bharatiya Lok Dal was merged into the Janata Party.

The seeds for the formation of BKD were sown on 9 April 1967, when Humayun Kabir organised a meeting of all non-Congress Chief Ministers and other important leaders in Delhi. At Indore session of BKD in November 1967, Mahamaya Prasad Sinha was elected as first chairman of the party.

See also
Indian National Congress breakaway parties

References

Defunct political parties in Uttar Pradesh
Political parties established in 1967
1967 establishments in Uttar Pradesh
Political parties disestablished in 1977
1977 disestablishments in India
Bharatiya Lok Dal
Conservative parties in India
Indian National Congress breakaway groups